Independent Congregational Church, also known as the Unitarian Church of Meadville, is a historic Congregational church at 346 Chestnut Street in Meadville, Crawford County, Pennsylvania.  It was built in 1835–1836. It is a large, squarish red brick building with a portico with Doric order columns supporting a pediment in the Greek Revival style. The church was designed by Gen. George Washington Cullum (1809-1892), who also designed Fort Sumter.  The congregation was a supporter of the Meadville Theological School.

It was added to the National Register of Historic Places in 1978.

References

External links

 Google Ebooks: A historical sketch of the Independent Congregational Church, Meadville, Pennsylvania, 1825-1900, accessed 08-18-2012
 Independent Congregational Church, Meadville, Crawford County, PA: 1 photo at Historic American Buildings Survey
 Harm Jan Huidekoper, a founder of the Independent Congregational Church and the Meadville Theological School

Historic American Buildings Survey in Pennsylvania
Churches on the National Register of Historic Places in Pennsylvania
Greek Revival church buildings in Pennsylvania
Churches completed in 1836
Churches in Crawford County, Pennsylvania
Meadville, Pennsylvania
National Register of Historic Places in Crawford County, Pennsylvania